W. Boone Fields (November 29, 1926 — December 3, 2001), also known as W.B. Fields, was a Texas politician who represented district 54 in the Texas House of Representatives, which at the time composed of Henderson County, Texas. He was affiliated with the Democratic Party.

Personal life
W. Boone Fields was born on November 29, 1926. He died at the age of 76 on December 3, 2001 and is buried at Oak Lawn Memorial Park in Athens, Texas.

Political career
Fields assumed office to represent district 54 of the Texas House of Representatives on January 9, 1951 succeeding Jack Yarbrough Hardee. While serving as a state representative, he served on the Common Carriers Committee, Criminal Jurisprudence Committee, Revenue and Taxation Committee, Penitentiaries Committee, and was vice chair of the Examination of Comptroller's and Treasurer's Accounts Committee. He left office on January 13, 1953 being succeeded by Jim Joseph Carmichall. Throughout his time in the legislature he was affiliated with the Democratic Party.

References

1926 births
2001 deaths
Democratic Party members of the Texas House of Representatives
20th-century American politicians